Paoline Ekambi (born 14 May 1962 in Paris, France) is a French former basketball player. She was inducted into the French Basketball Hall of Fame, in 2012.

French women's national team
Ekambi played in 254 games with the senior French national women's basketball team, from 1980 to 1993.

References 

French women's basketball players
Basketball players from Paris
French sportspeople of Cameroonian descent
Living people
1962 births